Orthocomotis sachatamiae is a species of moth of the family Tortricidae. It is found in Ecuador (Pichincha Province) and the Western Cordillera of Colombia.

The wingspan is 20.5–24 mm for males and 24.5 mm for females. The ground colour of the forewings is cream, the dorsal area suffused with brown and rust brown scales. The markings are brown. The hindwings are cream-brown, suffused with brownish, but browner on the periphery.

Etymology
The species name refers to the type locality, Sachatamia.

References

Moths described in 2007
Orthocomotis